Tanksley is a surname. Notable people with the surname include:

Ann Tanksley (born 1934), American artist
Charles B. Tanksley (born 1952), American politician
Steven D. Tanksley (born 1954), American academic